Truth Decay may refer to:

Truth Decay (T Bone Burnett album), 1980
Truth Decay (Hypnogaja album), 2009
 Truth Decay, a 2023 album by You Me at Six
 Truth Decay (book), a 2018 non-fiction book